Lethrinops lethrinus is a species of cichlid native to Lake Malawi and western shore feeder streams, Lake Malombe ,and the upper reaches of the Shire River.  It prefers areas in the lakes that are near river outlets  This species grows to a length of  TL.  It can also be found in the aquarium trade.

References

lethrinus
Fish described in 1894
Taxa named by Albert Günther
Taxonomy articles created by Polbot